Melvin Weinberg (December 4, 1924 – May 30, 2018) was an American con artist, charlatan and federal government informant who is known for his involvement in a sting operation in the late 1970s and early 1980s known as Abscam. 
At the time of the scandal, he was a convict hired by the Federal Bureau of Investigation to conduct the operation in exchange for probation. The two-year investigation initially targeted trafficking in stolen property and corruption of prominent businessmen, but later evolved into a public corruption investigation. The FBI, aided by the Justice Department were able to videotape various politicians and other officials accepting bribes from a fictitious Arabian company in return for various political favors. This led to the convictions of seven members of the United States Congress, among others.

His story was portrayed in the 2013 film American Hustle, with Christian Bale playing Irving Rosenfeld, a character based on Weinberg.

Weinberg was born in The Bronx, the son of Helen and Harry Weinberg. His mother was of Swiss descent and his father was of Russian Jewish ancestry. Weinberg was Jewish. After dropping out of school in grade nine, he served in the United States Navy in the Pacific from 1942 to 1946. He retired to Titusville, Florida. He died on May 30, 2018, aged 93.

References

1924 births
2018 deaths
Abscam
American confidence tricksters
American people of Russian-Jewish descent
American people of Swiss descent
Criminals from the Bronx
Federal Bureau of Investigation informants
Military personnel from New York City
People from Titusville, Florida